The Men's 100 metre backstroke S1 event at the 2016 Paralympic Games took place on 9 September 2016, at the Olympic Aquatics Stadium. No heats were held.

Final 
17:30 9 September 2016:

Notes

Swimming at the 2016 Summer Paralympics